The Geographica (Ancient Greek: Γεωγραφικά Geōgraphiká), or Geography, is an  encyclopedia of geographical knowledge, consisting of 17 'books', written in Greek and attributed to Strabo, an educated citizen of the Roman Empire of Greek descent. There is a fragmentary palimpsest dating to the fifth century. The earliest manuscripts of books 1–9 date to the tenth century, with a 13th-century manuscript containing the entire text.

Title of the work

Strabo refers to his Geography within it by several names:
 geōgraphia, "description of the earth"
 chōrographia, "description of the land"
 periēgēsis, "an outline"
 periodos gēs, "circuit of the earth"
 periodeia tēs chōrās, "circuit of the land"
Apart from the "outline", two words recur, "earth" and "country." Something of a theorist, Strabo explains what he means by Geography and Chorography:It is the sea more than anything else that defines the contours of the land (geōgraphei) and gives it its shape, by forming gulfs, deep seas, straits and likewise isthmuses, peninsulas, and promontories; but both the rivers and the mountains assist the seas herein. It is through such natural features that we gain a clear conception of continents, nations, favourable positions of cities and all the other diversified details with which our geographical map (chorographikos pinax) is filled.
From this description it is clear that by geography Strabo means ancient physical geography and by chorography, political geography. The two are combined in this work, which makes a "circuit of the earth" detailing the physical and political features. Strabo often uses the adjective geōgraphika with reference to the works of others and to geography in general, but not of his own work. In the Middle Ages it became the standard name used of his work.

Ascribed date

The date of Geographica is a large topic, perhaps because Strabo worked on it along with his History for most of his adult life. He traveled extensively, undoubtedly gathering notes, and made extended visits to Rome and Alexandria, where he is sure to have spent time in the famous library taking notes from his sources.

Strabo visited Rome in 44 BC at age 19 or 20 apparently for purposes of education. He studied under various persons, including Tyrannion, a captive educated Greek and private tutor, who instructed Cicero's two sons. Cicero says:The geographical work I had planned is a big undertaking...if I take Tyrannion's views too...
If one presumes that Strabo acquired the motivation for writing geography during his education, the latter must have been complete by the time of his next visit to Rome in 35 BC at 29 years old. He may have been gathering notes but the earliest indication that he must have been preparing them is his extended visit to Alexandria 25–20 BC. In 20 he was 44 years old. His "numerous excerpts" from "the works of his predecessors" are most likely to have been noted at the library there. Whether these hypothetical notes first found their way into his history and then into his geography or were simply ported along as notes remains unknown.

Most of the events of the life of Augustus mentioned by Strabo occurred 31–7 BC with a gap 6 BC – 14 AD, which can be interpreted as an interval after first publication in 7 BC. Then in 19 AD a specific reference dates a passage: he said that the Carni and Norici had been at peace since they were "stopped ... from their riotous incursions ...." by Drusus 33 years ago, which was 15 BC, dating the passage 19 AD. The latest event mentioned is the death of Juba at no later than 23 AD, when Strabo was in his 80s. These events can be interpreted as a second edition unless he saved all his notes and wrote the book entirely after the age of 80.

Oldest extant manuscripts
"Today there are about thirty manuscripts in existence, with a fragmentary palimpsest of the fifth century the earliest (Vaticanus gr. 2306 + 2061 A). Two manuscripts in Paris provide the best extant text: Parisinus gr. 1397 of the tenth century for Books 1-9, and Parisinus gr. 1393 of the thirteenth century for the entire text. The end of Book 7 had been lost sometime in the latter Byzantine period.

A Latin translation commissioned by Pope Nicholas V appeared in 1469: this was the edition probably used by Columbus and other early Renaissance explorers. The first printed Greek edition was the Aldine of 1516, and the first text with commentary was produced by Isaac Casaubon in Geneva in 1587. The Teubner edition appeared in 1852-3 under the editorship of August Meineke." (Roller 51–52)

Composition
Strabo is his own best expounder of his principles of composition:In short, this book of mine should be ... useful alike to the statesman and to the public at large – as was my work on History. ... And so, after I had written my Historical Sketches ... I determined to write the present treatise also; for this work is based on the same plan, and is addressed to the same class of readers, and particularly to men of exalted stations in life. ... in this work also I must leave untouched what is petty and inconspicuous, and devote my attention to what is noble and great, and to what contains the practically useful, or memorable, or entertaining. ... For it, too, is a colossal work, in that it deals with the facts about large things only, and wholes ....

Content
An outline of the encyclopedia follows, with links to the appropriate Wikipedia article.

Book I – definition and history of geography
Pages C1 through C67, Loeb Volume I pages 3–249.

Chapter 1 – description of geography and this encyclopedia

Chapter 2 – contributors to geography

Chapter 3 – physical geography

Chapter 4 – political geography

Book II – mathematics of geography
Pages C67 through C136, Loeb Volume I pages 252–521.

Chapter 1 – distances between parallels and meridians

Chapter 2 – the five zones

Chapter 3 – distribution of plants, animals, civilizations

Chapter 4 – criticisms of Polybius' and Eratosthenes' maps

Chapter 5 – Strabo's view of the ecumene

Book III – Iberian peninsula

Chapter 1 – Vicinity of the Sacred Cape

Chapter 2 – Bætica

Chapter 3

Chapter 4

Chapter 5

Book IV – Gaul, Britain, Ireland, Thule, the Alps

Book V – Italy to Campania

Book VI – south Italy, Sicily

Book VII – north, east and central Europe

Chapter 1 – Germania

Chapter 2 – Germania

Chapter 3 – northern Black Sea region

Chapter 4

Chapter 5

Chapter 6

Chapter 7

Book VIII – Greece

Book IX – More on Greece

Chapter 1 – Attica

Chapter 2 – Boeotia

Chapter 3 – Phocis

Chapter 4 – Locris

Chapter 5 – Thessaly

Book X – Yet more on Greece, Greek islands

Chapter 1 – Euboea

Chapter 2–3 – Aetolia and Acarnania

Chapter 4 – Crete

Chapter 5 – Archipelagos

Book XI – Russia east of the Don, the Transcaucasus, northwest Iran, Central Asia

Chapter 1 – East of the Don

Chapter 2 - Sarmatia

Chapter 3 – Iberia

Chapter 4 – Albania

Chapter 5 – The Caucasus

Chapter 6 - The Caspian

Chapter 7 - East of the Caspian

Chapter 8 - Geography of the Caspian and Iran

Chapter 9 – Parthia

Chapter 10 – Aria and Margiana

Chapter 11 – Bactria

Chapter 12 - The Taurus Mountains

Chapter 13 - Media

Chapter 14 - Armenia

Book XII – Anatolia

Chapter 1–2 – Cappadocia

Chapter 3 – Pontus

Chapter 4 – Bithynia

Chapter 5–7 – Galatia, Lycaonia and Pisidia

Chapter 8 – Phrygia

Book XIII – northern Aegean

Chapter 1 – Troad

Book XIV – eastern Aegean

Chapter 2 – Asia Minor

Book XV – Persia, Ariana, the Indian subcontinent

Book XVI – Middle East

Book XVII – North Africa

Chapter 1 – Nile, Egypt, Cyrenaica

Chapter 2

Chapter 3

Editorial history
Some thirty manuscripts of Geographica or parts of it have survived, almost all of them medieval copies of copies, though there are fragments from papyrus rolls which were probably copied out c. 100–300 AD. Scholars have struggled for a century and a half to produce an accurate edition close to what Strabo wrote. A definitive one (by translator Stefan Radt) has been in publication since 2002, appearing at a rate of about a volume a year.

Editions and translations

Ancient Greek
Kramer, Gustav, ed., Strabonis Geographica, 3 vols, containing Books 1–17. Berlin: Friedericus Nicolaus, 1844–52.

Ancient Greek and English
  Contains Books 1–17, Greek on the left page, English on the right. Sterrett translated Books I and II and wrote the introduction before dying in 1915. Jones changed Sterrett's style from free to more literal and finished the translation. The Introduction contains a major bibliography on all aspects of Strabo and a definitive presentation of the manuscripts and editions up until 1917.

French
  Books I – VI only.
 Books VII – XII only.

German
 Radt, Stefan (translator; critical apparatus) (2002–2011). Strabons Geographika. Göttingen: Vandenhoeck & Ruprecht. Books I–XVII in ten volumes.

See also
 Bibliotheca historica
 Diodorus Siculus
 Codex Vaticanus 2061

References

External links
The text of Strabo online
 
 
  Books 6–14.
 
  Books 6–14.

Other links
 World map as described by Strabo in Gegraphica

1st-century books
Ancient Greek geographical works
Roman-era Greek historiography
Greco-Roman ethnography
Greek encyclopedias
Encyclopedias in classical antiquity